Charles Binney (24 February 1901–1952) was an English footballer who played in the Football League for The Wednesday.

References

1901 births
1952 deaths
English footballers
Association football forwards
English Football League players
Sheffield Wednesday F.C. players
Worksop Town F.C. players
Wombwell F.C. players